Ülejõe (Estonian for "Across-the-River") is a neighbourhood of Tartu, Estonia.

Northern part of Ülejõe was earlier called as Kvissental (:et).

See also
University of Tartu Sports Hall
University of Tartu Stadium (:et)
Raudsild

References

Tartu